Sergio Palmieri (born 28 November 1945) is an Italian former professional tennis player. He was later John McEnroe's agent.

Born in Rome, Palmieri featured on the professional tour in the 1960s and 1970s.

Palmieri twice made the second round at Roland Garros, which included a win in 1965 over former tournament champion Jaroslav Drobný. His best performance on the Grand Prix circuit was a quarter-final appearance at the Senigallia Open in 1971.

References

External links
 
 

1945 births
Living people
Italian male tennis players
Italian sports agents
Tennis players from Rome